Robert Givone (born May 1, 1973) is an American former professional tennis player.

Givone, a native of Westchester (New York), turned professional in 1994 following three years of college tennis at Georgia Tech. He was a doubles bronze medalist at the University Games and on the professional tour reached a career high singles ranking of 347 in the world. His two ATP Tour main draw appearances included a first round match against Mark Philippoussis at the 1995 Legg Mason Tennis Classic, which he lost 4–6 in the third set. 

A shoulder injury ended his career at the age of 26 and he now works in finance.

ITF Futures titles

Doubles: (1)

References

External links
 
 

1973 births
Living people
American male tennis players
Georgia Tech Yellow Jackets men's tennis players
Tennis people from New York (state)
Sportspeople from Westchester County, New York
Universiade medalists in tennis
Universiade bronze medalists for the United States